Hugo Griffith Uryan Rhys, 10th Baron Dynevor (born 19 November 1966) is a British hereditary peer.

He was educated at Bryanston School and at the University of East Anglia where he graduated with a degree in drama in 1988. The son of Richard Rhys, 9th Baron Dynevor and Lucy Catherine King, he succeeded to the barony in 2008. He is the maternal grandson of Sir John Rothenstein. The heir presumptive to the Barony is Robert David Arthur Rhys, a great-grandson of Walter Rice, 7th Baron Dynevor and second cousin to the present Baron.

References

1966 births
Living people
People educated at Bryanston School
Alumni of the University of East Anglia
 10
Hugo